The angélique (French, from Italian angelica) is a plucked string instrument of the lute family of the baroque era. It combines features of the lute, the harp, and the theorbo.

It shares the form of its pear-shaped body as well as its vibrating string length of 54 to 70 cm with the lute. Differing from the lute, the 16 string angelica was single-strung like a theorbo, with which it shares its extended neck with a second peg box, bearing six bass strings.

Overview 
The angelica was tuned diatonically, like a harp: C – E – F – G – A – B – c – d – e – f – g – a – b – c’ – d’ – e’. That range is the same as that of the French or lesser theorbo, but the latter differs in that its tuning is reentrant: C – D – E – F – G – A – B – c – d – g – c' – e'– a – d'. The diatonic tuning limited its compass, but produced a full and clear tone by the increased use of open strings.

Little surviving music for the angelica as well as few surviving instruments indicate that the angelica flourished during the second half of the 17th and the beginning of the 18th centuries.

Some authors claim that the angelica was invented in England. But that claim is based on the misinterpretation of its name (M. H. Fuhrmann, Musicalischer Trichter, Frankfurt/Spree 1706, p. 91). James Talbot correctly interpreted angelica as “angel lute“ because of its lovely sound (ms. Oxford 532, 1685–1701).

Music for the angelica is notated in French tablature, with the designation of bass courses varying according to respective authors. The Ukrainian Torban is a descendant of the Angélique.

Bibliography
Jakob Kremberg, Musicalische Gemüths-Ergoetzung oder Arien ... (Dresden: 1689), in Tabulature
Adalbert Quadt (Hg.), Gitarrenmusik des 16-18. Jahrhunderts 2, nach Tabulaturen für Colascione, Mandora und Angelica, (Leipzig: 1971)
Hans Radtke (Hg.), Ausgewählte Stücke aus einer Angelica- und Gitarrentabulatur, Musik Alter Meister Heft 17, (Graz: 1967)
Praetorius, Theatrum instrumentorum
L. Brugmans, Le séjour de Christian Huygens à Paris (Paris,1935), 151 
F. Lesure: ‘The angélique in 1653’, GSJ, vi (1953), 111–12 
F. Lesure: ‘Les luthistes parisiens à l’époque de Louis XIII’, Le luth et sa musique (Neuilly-sur-Seine, 1957), 222–3 
M. Prynne: ‘James Talbot’s Manuscript: IV: Plucked Strings – the Lute Family’, GSJ, xiv (1961), 52–68 
E. Pohlmann, Laute, Theorbe, Chitarrone: die Instrumente, ihre Musik und Literatur von 1500 bis zur Gegenwart (Bremen, 1968, 5/1982), 394–7 
E. Vogl: ‘Die Angelika und ihre Musik’, HV, xi (1974), 356–71 
G. Hellwig, Joachim Tielke: ein Hamburger Lauten- und Violenmacher der Barockzeit (Frankfurt, 1980), 304–5 
F. und B. Hellwig, Joachim Tielke. Kunstvolle Musikinstrumente des Barock (Berlin/München, 2011), 108–111, 123-8
C. Meyer and M. Rollin, Oeuvres de Gumprecht (Paris, 1993), xvii

References

String instruments
Necked bowl lutes
Lutes
Early musical instruments
Baroque instruments